Nemophora fasciella is a moth of the Adelidae family. It is found in most of Europe, except Ireland, Fennoscandia, most of the Baltic region, Croatia, Slovenia, Switzerland and Portugal.

Adults have bronzy forewings with a central purplish fascia. Males have long silvery-white antennae, while females have shorter, blackish antennae with white tips. They are on wing in July.

The larvae feed on Ballota nigra. They first feed on the seeds. Later, they feed from within a case made from plant fragments.

References

External links
Lepiforum.de

Moths described in 1775
Adelidae
Moths of Europe
Moths of Asia
Taxa named by Johan Christian Fabricius